L´Imam Seydi (born 31 August 1985 in Paris) is a French-Senegalese football forward.

Career
In January 2016, Seydi joined Swiss Challenge League side FC Aarau on trial, before then signing an 18-month contract with Maltese club Birkirkara, on 29 January 2016.

In August 2016, it is reported that Seydi is currently undergoing a trial in Indonesian club Persib Bandung.

In January 2018, Seydi was loaned to Malaysia Premier League MISC-MIFA on a season-long deal.

Career statistics

References

External links
at dvtk.eu
at data.7m.cn

1985 births
Living people
Footballers from Paris
French footballers
French sportspeople of Senegalese descent
Association football forwards
Slovak Super Liga players
FK Bodva Moldava nad Bodvou players
2. Liga (Slovakia) players
Diósgyőri VTK players
Debreceni VSC players
Nemzeti Bajnokság I players
Azerbaijan Premier League players
French expatriate footballers
Expatriate footballers in Bahrain
Expatriate footballers in Spain
Expatriate footballers in Tunisia
Expatriate footballers in Slovakia
Expatriate footballers in Hungary
Expatriate footballers in Kuwait
Expatriate footballers in Malaysia
French expatriate sportspeople in Bahrain
French expatriate sportspeople in Spain
French expatriate sportspeople in Tunisia
French expatriate sportspeople in Slovakia
French expatriate sportspeople in Hungary
French expatriate sportspeople in Kuwait
French expatriate sportspeople in Malaysia
AS Gabès players
French expatriate sportspeople in Azerbaijan
Khaitan SC players
Kuwait Premier League players